Amlaíb mac Illuilb (died 977) was a tenth-century King of Alba. He was one of three sons of Illulb mac Custantín, King of Alba, and a member of Clann Áeda meic Cináeda, a branch of the Alpínid dynasty. Amlaíb's paternal grandfather possessed strong connections with the Scandinavian dynasty of Dublin, and there is evidence to suggest that Illulb and Amlaíb bore names of Old Norse origin. If Amlaíb's name indeed represents a Gaelicised Scandinavian name, it could indicate that his mother was a member of the Uí Ímair, and possibly a granddaughter of Amlaíb Cúarán or Amlaíb mac Gofraid.

Following Illulb's death in 962, the kingship of Alba was taken up by Dub mac Maíl Coluim, a member of Clann Custantín meic Cináeda, a rival branch of the Alpínid dynasty. This king soon faced opposition from Amlaíb's brother, Cuilén, before the latter secured the kingship for himself in 966. Cuilén and another son of Illulb were slain in 971, after which the kingship was taken up by Dub's brother, Cináed mac Maíl Choluim. According to Irish sources, the latter slew Amlaíb in 977. The fact that these sources style Amlaíb as a king, and fail to accord a royal title to Cináed, suggests that Amlaíb was successful in seizing the kingship from his rival. Amlaíb's short reign appears to date to 971/976–977.

Parentage and personal names

Amlaíb was one of three sons of Illulb mac Custantín, King of Alba (died 962). Amlaíb's paternal grandfather was Custantín mac Áeda, King of Alba (died 952), a man who possessed strong connections with the Scandinavian dynasty of Dublin. There is evidence to suggest that some of Custantín's descendants bore Scandinavian names. For instance, Illulb's name could be a Gaelicised form of the Old English personal name Eadwulf, or else a Gaelicised form of the Old Norse personal name Hildulfr.

Evidence of Scandinavian influence on the Scottish court may be a possible epithet accorded to Amlaíb's brother, Cuilén (died 971), by the ninth–twelfth-century Chronicle of the Kings of Alba. In one instance, this source records Cuilén's name as "Culenrīg". The bar above the letter "i" in this word appears to indicate that rīg should be expanded to "ring". Whilst it is possible that this word represents the Old Norse hringr, meaning "ring" or "ring-giver", the name may be corrupted from a scribal error, and the word itself might refer to something else.

Other possible evidence of Scandinavian influence upon Custantín's family may be Amlaíb's own name. Although his name may represent a 'modernised' form of the Gaelic personal name Amalgaid, a name often confused with Amlaíb in mediaeval sources, the latter name usually represents a Gaelicised form of the Old Norse personal name Óláfr. In fact, Amlaíb's name could indicate that his mother was a member of a Scandinavian kindred—perhaps the Uí Ímair—and conceivably a descendant of Amlaíb Cúarán (died 980/981) or Amlaíb mac Gofraid (died 941). Certainly, members of Gaelic dynasties were accorded Scandinavian names by the end of the century, just as members of insular Scandinavian dynasties began to bear Gaelic names. If Amlaíb's name is indeed Scandinavian in origin, he would be one of the first figures to bear such a cross-ethnic personal name.

Kin-strife amongst the Alpínids

Amlaíb and his immediate family were members of the ruling Alpínid dynasty, the patrilineal descendants of Cináed mac Ailpín, King of the Picts (died 858). The root of this kindred's remarkable early success laid in its ability to successfully rotate the royal succession amongst its members. For example, Illulb's father—a member of the Clann Áeda meic Cináeda branch of the dynasty—succeeded Domnall mac Causantín (died 900)—a member of the Clann Custantín meic Cináeda branch—and following a remarkable reign of forty years resigned the kingship to this man's son, Máel Coluim mac Domnaill (died 954). Amlaíb's father succeeded to the kingship following Máel Coluim's demise, and ruled as king until his own death in 962. The record of Illulb's fall at the hands of an invading Scandinavian host is the last time Irish and Scottish sources note Viking encroachment into the kingdom. The Scandinavian Kingdom of York had collapsed by the 950s, and the warbands of the kings of Dublin seem to have ceased their overseas adventures during this period as well. Unlike English monarchs who had to endure Viking depredations from the 980s to the 1010s, the kings of Alba were left in relative peace from about the time of Illulb's fall. Free from such outside threats, however, the Alpínids seem to have struggled amongst themselves.

There is some uncertainty regarding the succession after Illulb's demise. On one hand, he may well have been succeeded by Máel Coluim's son, Dub (died 966/967). On the other hand, there is reason to suspect that the kingship was temporarily shared by Dub and Cuilén, and that neither man had been strong enough to displace the other in the immediate aftermath of Illulb's passing. Although the Alpínid branches represented by Illulb and Dub seem to have maintained peace throughout Illulb's reign, inter-dynastic conflict clearly erupted in the years that followed. Dub appears to have spent much of his reign contending with Cuilén, Certainly, the two battled each other in 965. Dub was expelled from the kingship in the following year, and is recorded to have been slain in 966/967. Cuilén's undisputed reign seems to have spanned from 966 to 971. As far as surviving sources record, Cuilén's reign appears to have been relatively uneventful. His death in 971 is noted by several sources. According to the Chronicle of the Kings of Alba, Cuilén and his brother, Eochaid (died 971), were killed by Britons. There is reason to suspect that Cuilén's killer, a certain Rhydderch ap Dyfnwal (fl. 971), was a son of Dyfnwal ab Owain, King of Strathclyde (died 975).

Reign and death

Although the Chronicle of the Kings of Alba reports that Dub's brother, Cináed mac Maíl Choluim (died 995), was the next King of Alba, Irish sources—such as royal genealogies, the fourteenth-century Annals of Tigernach and the fifteenth–sixteenth-century Annals of Ulster—appear to reveal that Amlaíb possessed the kingship before his death at Cináed's hands. Whilst Cináed may well have initially succeeded to the kingship, it seems that Amlaíb was able to mount a successful—if only temporary—bid for the throne. Certainly, the aforesaid annal-entries style Amlaíb a king and accord Cináed a mere patronymic name. Although there is no specific evidence that Amlaíb and Cináed had constantly fought after Cuilén's demise, the Chronicle of the Kings of Alba ends its account at about 973, and the twelfth-century Prophecy of Berchán—an important source for the hostilities between Dub and Cuilén—suffers from a lacuna in its account of Cináed's reign. One possibility is that the kingship had been shared between Amlaíb and Cináed until the former's elimination.

Amlaíb's reign is not attested by any Scottish king-list, and it would appear that his regime was indeed brief, perhaps dating from 971/976–977. In the midst of this interval, the ninth–twelfth-century Anglo-Saxon Chronicle reveals that Edgar, King of the English (died 975) assembled a massive naval force and met with six kings at Chester in 975. Although later sources corroborate the event, the reliability of the names accorded to the assembled kings is less certain. Two of the named kings appear to be the aforesaid Dyfnwal and Cináed. Considering the fact that the Anglo-Saxon Chronicle numbers the kings at six, if Cináed was indeed present, it is unlikely that Amlaíb was in attendance as well. Although the chronology concerning the reigns of Cináed and Amlaíb is uncertain—with Cináed's reign perhaps dating from 971/977–995—the part played by the particular King of Alba at the assembly could well have concerned the frontier of his realm. One of the other named kings seems to have been Maccus mac Arailt (fl. 974), whilst another could have been this man's brother, Gofraid (died 989). These two Islesmen may have been regarded as threats by the Scots and Cumbrians. Maccus and Gofraid are recorded to have devastated Anglesey at the beginning of the decade, which could indicate that Edgar's assembly was undertaken as a means to counter the menace posed by these energetic siblings. In fact, there is evidence to suggest that, as a consequence of the assembly at Chester, the brothers may have turned their attention from the British mainland westwards towards Ireland, and that Gofraid ceased his operations in Wales until the next decade. Whatever the case, within two years both Dyfnwal and Edgar were dead. Contemporary English sources described the period after Edgar's demise as a time of "dissension", "trouble", "sedition", and "most unhappy times". In fact, the upheaval caused by the deaths of these men may well have contributed to Cináed's elimination of Amlaíb.

According to the twelfth-century De primo Saxonum adventu, at some point Edgar granted Lothian to Cináed in return for his recognition of English overlordship. If correct, one possibility is that the transaction dates to the 960s/970s, and was intended to assist Cináed's opposition against Amlaíb. The revolving succession within the Alpínid dynasty reveals that the inter-dynastic struggle between Cuilén and Dub was continued by their respective brothers. As for Cuilén's other brother, Eochaid, this man's death with Cuilén seems to be evidence of his prominent position within the kingdom. The fact that Amlaíb reigned after his brother's death likewise appears to indicate that he too played an important part in Cuilén's regime. One of Cináed's first acts as king was evidently an invasion of the kingdom of the Cumbrians. Although this campaign may well have been a retaliatory response to Cuilén's killing, it may be more likely that Cináed carried out this enterprise in the context of crushing a British affront to Scottish authority rather than as a means of avenging the death of his kinsman. In any event, Cináed's invasion ended in defeat, a fact which coupled with Cuilén's killing reveals that the Kingdom of Strathclyde was indeed a power to be reckoned with.

Notes

Citations

References

Primary sources

Secondary sources

977 deaths
10th-century Scottish monarchs
House of Alpin
Gaelic monarchs in Scotland